The 2000 United States Senate election in Texas took place on November 7, 2000. Incumbent Republican U.S. Senator Kay Bailey Hutchison won re-election to a second full term. As of 2022, this is the last time Travis County voted Republican in a statewide election and the last time a Republican won every county in the Texas Triangle in a statewide election.

Major candidates

Democratic 
 Gene Kelly, retired attorney

Republican 
 Kay Bailey Hutchison, incumbent U.S. Senator

Results

See also 
 2000 United States Senate elections

References

External links 

Texas
2000
United States Senate